In Inuit religion, the Tizheruk is a mythical large serpent-like creature that is said to inhabit the waters near Key Island, Alaska. It is said to have a two-metre (6.6 ft) head and a tail with a flipper. The local Inuit claim that it has snatched people off piers without their noticing its presence. It is also called Pal-Rai-Yûk. It is said to be similar to Naitaka of the Okanakanes (Ogopogo) and the Haietlik of the Nuu-chah-nulth.

Further reading
 Brian Molyneaux. "The North American Indians and Inuit Nations: Myths and Legends of North America (Mythology of)" 
 Rink, Henry (1875). Tales and Traditions of the Eskimo (with a Sketch of their Habits, Religion, Language and other Peculiarities). London. Reduced to HTML by Christopher M. Weimer, April 2003.

Inuit legendary creatures
Legendary serpents